Kushulevo (Köşöl) is a rural locality (a selo) in Takarlikovsky Selsoviet, Dyurtyulinsky District, Bashkortostan, Russia. The population was 407 as of 2010. There are 15 streets.

Geography 
Kushulevo is located 7 km northwest of Dyurtyuli (the district's administrative centre) by road. Yuntiryak is the nearest rural locality.

References 

Rural localities in Dyurtyulinsky District